The 1927 Virginia Cavaliers football team represented the University of Virginia as a member of the Southern Conference (SoCon) during the 1927 college football season. Led by fifth-year head coach Greasy Neale, the Cavaliers compiled an overall record of 5–4 with a mark of 4–4 in conference play, tying for eighth place in the SoCon. The team played its games at Lambeth Field in Charlottesville, Virginia.

Schedule

References

Virginia
Virginia Cavaliers football seasons
Virginia Cavaliers football